Psidopala opalescens is a moth in the family Drepanidae. It was described by Sergei Alphéraky in 1897. It is found in Myanmar and the Chinese provinces of Sichuan, Yunnan and Tibet.

References

Moths described in 1897
Thyatirinae
Moths of Asia